Verconia varians is a species of colorful sea slug, a dorid nudibranch, a shell-less marine gastropod mollusk in the family Chromodorididae.

Distribution 
This marine species is widely distributed in the Indo-Pacific from Indonesia to the Hawaiian islands.

Description
 Body: translucent coloration with a segmented white stripe on the midline, a white mantle margin, and a magenta submarginal line. 
 Rhinophores: translucent base with orange tips
 Gills: translucent base with magenta tips

This species is one of several chromodorids that vibrate their gills.  Up to 20 mm in length.

Ecology

References

 Pease, W.H. 1871. Descriptions of new nudibranchiate Mollusca inhabiting Polynesia. American Journal of Conchology 7: 11-20
 Marshall, J.G. & Willan, R.C. 1999. Nudibranchs of Heron Island, Great Barrier Reef. Leiden : Backhuys 257 pp.

External links
 

Chromodorididae
Gastropods described in 1871